Simplicity Hill is a small ice-free hill rising 1 mile (1.6 km) west of Crilly Hill, at the north side of McGregor Glacier, in the Queen Maud Mountains. So named by the Texas Tech Shackleton Glacier Expedition (1964–65) because of the ease with which they were able to approach the feature, and because of the relative simplicity of its geologic nature.

Queen Maud Mountains
Hills of the Ross Dependency
Dufek Coast